Italy competed at the 1997 Summer Universiade, as host nation, in Catania and won 32 medals.

Medals

Details

References

External links
 Catania 1997 complete results at FISU web site
 Universiade (World University Games)
 WORLD STUDENT GAMES (UNIVERSIADE - MEN)
 WORLD STUDENT GAMES (UNIVERSIADE - WOMEN)

1997
Nations at the 1997 Summer Universiade
Summer Univ